Tạ Tỵ (24 September 1922 – 24 August 2004) was a Vietnamese painter and poet. After the Vietnam War ended in 1975, he was sent to a reeducation camp until 1981. Afterwards he and his wife left Vietnam as boat people via Malaysia and resettled in California in 1983. He returned to Vietnam shortly before his death in 2004. His paintings were originally influenced by cubism turning to abstract art around 1961.

References

Vietnamese male poets
1922 births
2004 deaths
20th-century Vietnamese painters
20th-century Vietnamese poets
People from Hanoi
20th-century male writers